The Lisbon Women's Cup is a women's football international invitational summer tournament held in Lisbon. It's organized by CF Benfica, which created it in 2015 after winning its first national championship.

2015 edition
It was contested on May 23–24 by four clubs, including two 2015-16 Champions League teams. In addition to Portuguese champion CF Benfica, the contestants were:

 Atlético Madrid, runner-up of the Spanish league. 
 CD Transportes Alcaine from Zaragoza, 13th in the 2014-15 Spanish league.
 PSV/FC Eindhoven, 5th in the 2014–15 BeNe League.

Transportes Alcaine won the trophy on penalties in a Spanish final.

References

Women's football friendly trophies
Sport in Lisbon
Recurring sporting events established in 2015
Women's football competitions in Portugal
2015 establishments in Portugal